Machavariani David Mikhailovich, (Russian: Мачавариани Давид Михайлович) (born 08.30.1886) Colonel, The Commander of the 490th Infantry Rzhevsky Regiment in Russian Imperial Army from 04.26.1916
Awarded the Order of St. George 4th Class. (Decision of the Petrograd GD 10.25.1917) 

Military Orders:
 Order of St. Anne 3rd class (1907);
 Order of St. Stanislaus 2nd class (1910);
 Order of St. Vladimir 4th class with swords and bow ( VI 23.03.1915 )
 Order of St. Vladimir 3rd class with swords ( VI 12.21.1916);
 Order of St. George 4th class (Post. Petrograd GD 10.25.1917)

References

 "Военный орден святого великомученика и победоносца Георгия. Биобиблиографический справочник" РГВИА, М., 2004.
 Общий список офицерским чинам русской императорской армии. Составлен по 1-е янв. 1909
 Список капитанам армейской пехоты по старшинству. Составлен по 01.11.1911. С-Петербург, 1912
 Список полковникам по старшинству. Составлен по 01.08.1916. Петроград, 1916
 ВП по военному ведомству//Разведчик No.1280, 19.05.1915
 ВП по военному ведомству//Разведчик No.1281, 26.05.1915
 ВП по Военному ведомству. 1916. Информацию предоставил Константин Подлесский

1886 births
Recipients of the Order of St. George
Recipients of the Order of St. Vladimir
Year of death missing

Russian military personnel of World War I